Acts 12 is the twelfth chapter of the Acts of the Apostles in the New Testament of the Christian Bible. It records the death of the first apostle, James, son of Zebedee, followed by the miraculous escape of Peter from prison, the death of Herod Agrippa I, and the early ministry of Barnabas and Paul of Tarsus. The book containing this chapter is anonymous, but early Christian tradition uniformly affirmed that Luke composed this book as well as the Gospel of Luke.

Text 

The original text was written in Koine Greek. This chapter is divided into 25 verses.

Textual witnesses
Some early manuscripts containing the text of this chapter are:
 Codex Vaticanus (AD 325–350)
 Codex Sinaiticus (330–360)
 Codex Bezae (~400)
 Papyrus 127 (5th century; extant verses 1-3, 5, 7–9)
 Codex Alexandrinus (400–440)
 Codex Laudianus (~550)

Locations

This chapter mentions the following places:
 Caesarea
 Jerusalem
 Judea
 Sidon
 Tyre

Timescale
Meyer estimated that these events took place in 44 AD, the year of the death of Herod Agrippa, at the same time as the prophets from Jerusalem travelled to Antioch and returned with aid for the Judean church. The Cambridge Bible for Schools and Colleges suggests 43 AD.

Herod persecutes the apostles (12:1–5)
Sometime after the events in the previous chapter, the apostles in Jerusalem are harassed by a new persecution (12:1) by a "Herod", not Herod Antipas who was involved in the trial of Jesus but Agrippa I, a grandson of Herod the Great, resulting in the killing of James the son of Zebedee and the imprisonment of Simon Peter.

Peter freed from prison (12:6–11)

This part of the chapter tells that after Peter was put into prison by King Herod, on the night before his trial an angel appeared to him, and told him to leave. Peter's chains fell off, and he followed the angel out of prison, thinking it was a vision (verse 9). The prison doors opened of their own accord, and the angel led Peter into the city.

Verse 7
 Now behold, an angel of the Lord stood by him, and a light shone in the prison; and he struck Peter on the side and raised him up, saying, “Arise quickly!” And his chains fell off his hands.
This verse is referred to in Charles Wesley's hymn And Can It Be.

Peter's reception by the church (12:12–17)
Peter's reception by the church in this account has an element of humor that far from expecting their prayers to be answered, the believers are completely taken aback when Peter knocks at the door that the maid Rhoda (another minor character noted by Luke) runs back to the house instead of quickly open the door, so despite his supernatural escape, when prison doors was opened up for him, the house doors 'remain obstinately closed' for Peter.

Verse 12
 Thinking about that, he came to the house of Mary, the mother of John who was called Mark, where many were gathered together and were praying.

Verse 17
But motioning to them with his hand to keep silent, he declared to them how the Lord had brought him out of the prison. And he said, "Go, tell these things to James and to the brethren." And he departed and went to another place.
,), to indicate 'a wish to bring forward something', seeking 'the silence and attention of those present'.

Herod's reaction and death (12:18–23)
The accounts focus briefly back to the prison, where Herod ('depicted as a typical persecuting tyrant') vents his frustration on his subordinates. There is an irony in the situation that 'neither the soldiers nor Herod share the readers' privileged knowledge of Peter's secret' and whereabouts. Herod's sensational death (verses 20-23) was well documented in Josephus' Antiquities of the Jews (19.343-50), and while it is independent from Luke's account, both have 'Herod dying a horrible death as a punishment for being acclaimed as divine'.

Verse 23
 Then immediately an angel of the Lord struck him, because he did not give glory to God. And he was eaten by worms and died.
"Him" and "he" refer to Herod Agrippa I
"Died" or "breathed his last"

Summary and transition (12:24–25)
This part contrasts the death of the persecutor with the successful growth of God's word (verse 24) with the expansion of the church (cf. 9:31) by God's power. Verse 25 provides a narrative link of the completed relief mission by the major characters from this point on as they return to Antioch.

Verse 25
And Barnabas and Saul returned from Jerusalem when they had fulfilled their ministry, and they also took with them John whose surname was Mark.
"From Jerusalem": some manuscripts read 'to' Jerusalem, linking it with 'mission' rather than with 'returned', thus rendering this 'returned (i.e. to Antioch) having completed their service (diakonia) to Jerusalem'.

See also 

 Related Bible parts: Acts 9, Acts 13, Acts 15

Notes

References

Sources

External links
 King James Bible - Wikisource
English Translation with Parallel Latin Vulgate
Online Bible at GospelHall.org (ESV, KJV, Darby, American Standard Version, Bible in Basic English)
Multiple bible versions at Bible Gateway (NKJV, NIV, NRSV etc.)

12
Phoenicians in the New Testament